Robert Eneas Lamberton (September 14, 1886 – August 22, 1941) was an American Republican politician who served as the 114th mayor of Philadelphia from 1940 to 1941.

He was born in Bethlehem, Pennsylvania, and ran an unsuccessful campaign for Pennsylvania Governor in 1934. He ran successfully for Philadelphia mayor in 1939 against Robert White, a Democrat, garnering 398,384 votes to White's 361,143.

Lamberton suffered from Parkinson’s Disease and, died while recovering at his shore house in Longport, New Jersey on August 22, 1941. The City Council President Bernard Samuel succeeded him as mayor.

Several years later, a school was named after him in Philadelphia's Overbrook Park section.  The school has been called Robert E. Lamberton Public School, Lamberton Public School, Robert E. Lamberton High School, Robert E. Lamberton Eastern Early College High School, and Lamberton High School.

References

External links

1886 births
1941 deaths
Mayors of Philadelphia
Pennsylvania Republicans
20th-century American politicians